Southern Star Shipping Co. Inc. is a transportation and logistics company founded by George S. Coumantaros in New York in 1947.

The company is headquartered at 1370 Avenue of the Americas, New York, NY.

It was founded by George S. Coumantaros in New York in 1947.

His son John Coumantaros began his career in 1984 with Southern Star, and has been president since 2009.

References

Companies based in Manhattan
Transport companies established in 1947
1947 establishments in New York City
Coumantaros family